Burnham is an unincorporated community in Coulee Rural Municipality No. 136, Saskatchewan, Canada.

The name probably comes from Burnham-on-Sea, Somerset, although it's possible it may derive from another Burnham in England.

See also 
 List of communities in Saskatchewan

References 

Coulee No. 136, Saskatchewan
Unincorporated communities in Saskatchewan